Giorgio Morbidelli (born 16 March 1974) is an Italian bobsledder. He competed in the four man event at the 2006 Winter Olympics.

References

1974 births
Living people
Italian male bobsledders
Olympic bobsledders of Italy
Bobsledders at the 2006 Winter Olympics
Sportspeople from Ancona